Cnemaspis paripari, also known as the fairy rock gecko, is a species of gecko endemic to Sarawak in Borneo.

References

Cnemaspis
Reptiles described in 2009